Pi Gamma Mu or  (from Πολιτικές Γνώσεως Μάθεται) is the oldest and preeminent honor society in the social sciences. It is also the only interdisciplinary social science honor society. It serves the various social science disciplines which seek to understand and explain human behavior and social relationships as well as their concomitant problems and issues. Pi Gamma Mu's constitution defines the social sciences to include the disciplines of history, political science, sociology, anthropology, economics, psychology, international relations, criminal justice, social work, social philosophy, history of education, and human geography. Membership is also extended to interdisciplinary social science fields that build on the core social science disciplines, such as business administration, education, cultural and area studies, public administration, and organizational behavior.

The mission of Pi Gamma Mu is to encourage and recognize superior scholarship in social science disciplines and to foster cooperation and social service among its members.

History

In 1924, Dr. Leroy Allen, dean of the College of Liberal Arts at Southwestern College in Winfield, Kansas and Dr. William Angus Hamilton, dean of both the Law School and School of Business Administration at The College of William & Mary in Williamsburg, Virginia established an honor society to promote academic excellence and achieve "integration and humanization" in the social sciences. The early 1900s witnessed the autonomous development of the younger social science fields, including social work, international relations and criminal justice. Of greater concern among some of the leading scholars of the time was what they saw as the increasing tendency toward "sheer quantification" and "mensuration" in the traditional social science disciplines. The founders of the new honor society believed that "if the social sciences are to render any adequate service to humanity, factionalism, separatism and dehumanization in them must be overcome."

The honor society was named Pi Gamma Mu from the initials of the three Greek words that describe the society's objective: Politixes Gnōseōs Mathetai (Πολιτικές Γνώσεως Μάθεται), the study of political and social science. The term Politixes or "political science or phenomena" encompassed the field of economics, which was then commonly referred to as political economy, its original name. Pi Gamma Mu stood not only for scholarship in the social sciences, but also for synthesis and cooperation among its various branches. It was an early advocate of an interdisciplinary as well as a cross-disciplinary approach to the study of social problems.

In Dean Allen, Pi Gamma Mu had a creative visionary and in Dean Hamilton a highly respected leader who was also described as "an authority on fraternal organizations and a leader in fraternal circles." By November 1924, the founding members led by Dean Allen and Dean Hamilton had drafted a constitution for the society and issued charters to the first 17 chapters, mostly private, liberal arts colleges and universities led by Southwestern College and the College of William and Mary. The next year, the first issue of the society's official journal, Social Science (subtitled "For the scientific study of social problems"), was published and distributed to its members. The journal's stated objectives were "the promotion of the social sciences in college curricula" and "the integration of the social sciences in the education of students." The society was formally incorporated as a non-profit organization in the state of Colorado in 1929 under the name "The National Social Science Honor Society, Pi Gamma Mu, Inc".

After Dr. Hamilton died in 1929, much of the groundwork for the new Society had to be laid by Dr. Allen who served as its first national president (1924–1931) and then national secretary (1931–1947). Pi Gamma Mu had for its succeeding presidents several distinguished social scientists, including the noted sociologist and American Sociological Association president Charles Abram Ellwood of Duke University, co-founder of the society and its president from 1931 to 1937, Dr. S. Howard Patterson (president, 1937–1951), a renowned microeconomist who was then professor of economics at the Wharton School of the University of Pennsylvania and author of several classic textbooks in the field, and political scientist W. Leon Godshall of Lehigh University, the society's president from 1951 until his untimely death in 1956 and under whose initiative the founding of foreign chapters was authorized.

At a time when very few women held leadership positions anywhere, Pi Gamma Mu elected Grace Raymond Hebard, one of its founders, as national vice-president (1924–1931). Then the foremost historian of the Native Americans, Dr. Hebard was also a civil engineer, surveyor, bibliography scholar, head of the University of Wyoming's political economy department and a leader in the women's suffrage movement in the United States.
 
The late 1920s and 1930s was a period of heightened growth for Pi Gamma Mu. Columbia University in New York City was the first large university to establish a chapter (1925) of the society. The University of Hawaii chapter was the first to be organized outside of the continental United States. In 1932, the first foreign chapter was chartered at the University of Toronto in Canada. Later that year, a chapter was also installed at the University of the Philippines; a second Philippine chapter was organized at De La Salle University in 1989. In 1955, the trustees of Pi Gamma Mu voted to grant a charter to the Pontifical Catholic University of Puerto Rico. In 2007, the Kuwait Alpha at the American University of Kuwait became Pi Gamma Mu's newest international chapter.

To acknowledge its chapters outside of the United States, the board of trustees took action in 1980 to change the name of the society to "Pi Gamma Mu, International Honor Society in Social Sciences". In 1982, the name of its official journal was also changed to International Social Science Review. In 1991 to enhance its international scope, the trustees approved the conferring of affiliate (or associate member) status on visiting fellows and exchange students who demonstrate academic excellence in their fields but are not otherwise expected to complete their degree programs at a Pi Gamma Mu sheltering college or university. The same international emphasis continued as the Philippines Alpha chapter commemorated its 75th Anniversary on March 7, 2007. The unique influence of the Philippines Alpha chapter is recorded in Scott Johnston's work, Pi Gamma Mu International Honor Society in Social Science First 75 Years: “Again the quality of the people elected to the Philippines Alpha chapter has been most impressive. They have included two Presidents of the Republic, two Prime Ministers, a dozen Supreme Court Justices, and two dozen Cabinet members. Concerning the University of the Philippines itself, there have been six Presidents, a dozen Vice Chancellors and dozens upon dozens of Deans of the University.”

Pi Gamma Mu currently has active chapters in over 150 colleges and universities. Its total elected members number over 234,000.

Election to membership
Membership in the society comes only through election by a college-based or university-based chapter. An individual is traditionally invited or may petition to join an active collegiate chapter of Pi Gamma Mu when he/she is a junior, senior or graduate student, belonging to the upper 35% of the class, with at least 20 semester hours in social science courses with an average grade therein of "B" or better, no failed grades, and of good moral character. Chapters may increase these minimum standards for election to life membership. Faculty and administrators can also be elected to membership by a collegiate chapter.
 
Newly initiated members receive an engraved membership certificate, a membership card, the society key or pin, and lifetime access to its official journal and newsletter. A one-time induction fee covers these and the privilege of lifetime membership in Pi Gamma Mu, including participation in its various activities, attendance at scholarly meetings, and eligibility to compete for graduate fellowships. Membership in Pi Gamma Mu can also advance a federal employee's civil service position grade or rating.

Famous members
Throughout its 83 years of existence, the international social sciences honor society of Pi Gamma Mu has produced many well-known scholars, diplomats, political leaders, business leaders and pioneering professionals. The list is not exhaustive and is simply intended to illustrate the breadth of scholarship and service of the society's members.

In addition to former Pi Gamma Mu presidents Charles Abram Ellwood, S. Howard Patterson and W. Leon Godshall, prominent members of the society include former U.S. president Lyndon B. Johnson, 1956 Nobel Prize winner and former Canadian prime minister Lester B. Pearson, former Philippine presidents José P. Laurel and Ferdinand Marcos, Panama Canal Treaty negotiator and former Panama president Ricardo Joaquín Alfaro Jované, leading anthropologist Margaret Mead, sociologist Pitirim Sorokin (Pi Gamma Mu national vice-president, 1937–1941) who founded Harvard University's sociology department, Edward A. Ross, a major figure in early criminology, Ernst Philip Boas, famous cardiologist and inventor of the cardiotachometer and original proponent of national health insurance, Jane Addams, 1931 Nobel Prize winner and pioneer community worker, MIT economist Charles P. Kindleberger, architect of the Marshall Plan, incumbent US Senator Chuck Grassley of Iowa, incumbent Colorado Congresswoman Diana DeGette, deputy whip of the U.S. House of Representatives, groundbreaking experimental psychologist and incumbent Rockefeller Foundation president Judith Rodin - the first female president of an Ivy League university (University of Pennsylvania), incumbent commissioner of the Federal Communications Commission Michael Copps, incumbent Philippine Senators Edgardo Angara, Miriam Defensor Santiago and Juan Ponce Enrile, internationally recognized constitutionalist Henry J. Abraham, incumbent North Carolina Supreme Court senior justice Mark Martin, prominent California lawyer and former U.S. Attorney General William French Smith, banker, U.S. Secretary of the Treasury and Ambassador to NATO David M. Kennedy, 1971 Economics Nobel 
Prize winner Simon Kuznets, historian and 1949 Pulitzer Prize winner Roy Nichols, Paul Finkelstein, incumbent board chairman, president and chief executive officer of Regis Corporation, the worldwide leader in the hair salon industry and American football player Lem Burnham.

Former U.S. Transportation Secretary William Thaddeus Coleman, Jr., who was inducted into the University of Pennsylvania chapter in 1941, wrote the legal brief which won the U.S. Supreme Court's landmark decision in Brown v. Board of Education (1954) outlawing racial segregation in public education.

Another Pi Gamma Mu member, U.S. Navy Rear Admiral Richard Evelyn Byrd, the pioneering American polar explorer and famous aviator, served for a time as Honorary National President (1931–1935) of Pi Gamma Mu. In 1928, Byrd carried the society's flag during a historic expedition to the Antarctic to dramatize the spirit of adventure into the unknown, characterizing both the natural and social sciences.

In 2018, notable American Public University System alumnus and Canadian human rights activist Yasser Harrak was inducted into American Public University System's West Virginia Iota chapter.

Awards and scholarships

Pi Gamma Mu provides five named scholarships which carry stipends of $2000 or $1000 and six additional scholarships of $1,000 each to assist with the costs related to the first or second year of graduate study. These are awarded to selected members annually. Any member of the society is eligible to apply as a graduating senior or as a prospective graduate student.

Outstanding chapters of the society are eligible to receive the Roll of Distinction, Roll of Merit and the Joseph B. James chapter Incentive awards on a purely competitive basis. The Roll of Distinction is given to chapters based on their activity and effectiveness on their respective campuses as well as efficiency of operations during a school year. Local initiative in developing new activities or methods of operation is especially noted. The annual Roll of Merit is given as a form of honorable mention based on the same criteria. The Joseph B. James chapter Incentive Award, named after a long-time president (1963–1971) of the society, is presented every three years to reward the performance of a new or newly reactivated chapter, which substantially increases its focus on one or more areas, such as membership or activities. Each of the three listed chapter awards are conferred by the board of trustees after assessing the annual chapter reports with focus on their service, service projects, procedures and yearly activities.

The Guest Lectureship Program of Pi Gamma Mu exists for the purpose of advancing social science interaction and serves as a memorial to deceased officers of the society. Active chapters are eligible to apply for lectureship funds of $300.00 each year to cover the honoraria of guest lecturers. The topic of the lecture must be related to one or more of the fields within the scope of Pi Gamma Mu as defined by its constitution. The lecturer should have special qualifications and must be a guest, not a member, of the local faculty, administration or staff of a sheltering college or university.

Publications
Membership in Pi Gamma Mu also serves as a valued opportunity to publish in a scholarly journal. The International Social Science Review is a juried and indexed social science interdisciplinary journal which is available online free of charge to any individual or institution. Social scientists in the United States and abroad contribute articles and book reviews to the publication. Pi Gamma Mu members are encouraged to submit manuscripts to be considered for publication.

The Pi Gamma Mu Newsletter was first published in 1978. It reaches members five times a year and contains pictures and news of the programs and activities of the international society and its chapters. Reports of trustee meetings and conventions are included as well as announcements and items of interest. Contributions for the Newsletter go to headquarters operations.

Symbols and ideals

 Motto 
The motto of the society is the epigram of the Master Teacher, “Cognoscetis veritatem et veritas vos liberabit” (Ye shall know the truth and the truth shall set you free). It is traditionally recited during the initiation ceremonies for new members.

 Key 
The society’s gold key (shown above) has a wreath at the bottom to suggest that social science is the outgrowth and fulfillment of natural science. The running figure is reminiscent of the ancient Greek torch race and symbolizes humanity bringing knowledge to the solution of its own problems and passing on the light from generation to generation. The detail of the Greek torch is illustrated below. In the key are engraved the Greek letters Pi Gamma Mu and 1924, its founding year. Colors 
The official colors are royal blue and white - for truth and light. These are also the colors of the candles used during the initiation ceremonies and the honor cords or stoles worn at graduation (also shown above). Flower 
The official flower is the blue and white cineraria. Flag 
The redesigned blue flag (shown above) depicts a man and a woman jointly holding the torch of knowledge within the symbolic gold key and wreath of Pi Gamma Mu.
  RitualAn official ritual, for the most part dating back to 1925, has been adopted for optional use in initiating new members (photo), inaugurating officers, and installing new chapters.The Seven IdealsPart of the initiation and installation rituals is the declaration of the seven ideals of Pi Gamma Mu: Scholarship, Science, Social Science, Social Idealism, Sociability, Social Service, and Sacrifice.

Governance

The present constitution of the society provides for triennial conventions, with each chapter eligible to send a delegation. The convention is vested with the supreme authority of the society. During the convention, delegates elect two student representatives to the board of trustees, which exercises administrative power between conventions.

Members of the board of trustees are elected by the chapters for three-year terms to coincide with each triennium. The president of the society provides leadership to the board and executes the policies of the convention and the board. There is a vice-president for chapter development and another one for scholarships and awards. Four chancellors oversee regions made up of several provinces. Regional chancellors assume responsibility for liaison between the international organization and the chapters in their respective regions. The provinces are headed by governors who lend support and assistance to the collegiate chapters under their jurisdiction. As the situation warrants, the president shall appoint governors and vice-chancellors who hold office for three years or until their successors are chosen.

Each chapter, under the direction of faculty sponsors and elected student officers, plans its own programs and specific areas of service. Chapters bear the names of their respective states along with a Greek letter denoting their order of precedence within each state as determined by the charter date. Hence, the chapter at the University of Wyoming (founded in 1924 by Dr. Hebard) is officially known as the Wyoming Alpha chapter, being the first to be chartered in that state.
 
The Pi Gamma Mu international headquarters have always been located in Winfield, Kansas, its birthplace. It presently occupies the Carnegie Building, which is on the National Register of Historic Buildings. The executive director of the society serves as ex officio member of the governing board and oversees its day-to-day operations.

Institutional affiliations
Pi Gamma Mu is a member of the Association of College Honor Societies (ACHS), on whose council it has a representative.

It is also affiliated with the American Association for the Advancement of Science (AAAS), which classifies Pi Gamma Mu as a constituent organization of Section K--Social, Economic, and Political Sciences. As an affiliate organization, Pi Gamma Mu is entitled to representation by two delegates during the meetings of the AAAS.

References
Bryson, W. Hamilton. Legal Education in Virginia 1779-1979: A Biographical Approach. Charlottesville, VA: University Press of Virginia, 1982. Colonial Echo. Williamsburg, VA: College of William and Mary, 1925 to 1933.International Social Science Review , Vol. 57 no. 1 (Winter 1982) to Vol. 84 no. 3/4 (Fall/Winter 2006). Winfield, Kansas: Social Science Publishing, Corp. ISSN 0278-2308; OCLC 7757493Johnston, Scott D. Pi Gamma Mu International Honor Society in Social Science: First 75 Years. Winfield, KS, 1999.
Mendoza, Roger Lee. Negotiating Between Antecedents, Precedents and Innovations: The Pi Gamma Mu Story at Penn. Philadelphia: The University of Pennsylvania Press, 2008, http://franklin.library.upenn.edu/record.html?q=roger%20mendoza&qt=dla-author&id=FRANKLIN_4387400&.Pi Gamma Mu Newsletter , 1978-2006 issues. Winfield, Kansas.Scharff, Virginia. "The Independent and Feminine Life: Grace Raymond Hebard, 1861-1936" in Lone Voyagers: Academic Women in Coeducational Universities, 1870-1937. New York: Feminist Press at the City University of New York, 1989.Social Science (Pi Gamma Mu Quarterly), Vol. 1 (November 1925) to Vol. 56 (Autumn 1981). Winfield, Kansas: Social Science Publishing, Corp. ISSN 0037-7848
University Archives and Records Center, University of Pennsylvania. Pi Gamma Mu Documents, 1933-1958. Philadelphia, PA: University of Pennsylvania.Who's Who in Pi Gamma Mu : A National Directory of officers and members of the national social science honor society of Pi Gamma Mu, Inc.'' Winfield, Kansas, 1930. OCLC 7888379

Footnotes

External links

  ACHS Pi Gamma Mu entry
 Pi Gamma Mu chapter list at ACHS

Association of College Honor Societies
Honor societies
Student organizations established in 1924
1924 establishments in Kansas